Sofian El Fani (born 28 January 1974) is a Tunisian cinematographer. His credits include Timbuktu, Blue Is the Warmest Colour, It Must Be Heaven, and Black Venus.

See also
Cinema of Tunisia

References

External links

Cinematographers
Film people from Zürich
Living people
1974 births
Place of birth missing (living people)
Tunisian film people
21st-century Tunisian people